Daniel Trilling is a British journalist, editor and author. He was the editor of New Humanist magazine from 2013 to 2019. He writes about migration, nationalism and human rights and is the author of Lights in the Distance: exile and refuge at the borders of Europe and Bloody Nasty People: The Rise of Britain's Far Right. The publications he has written for include the New Statesman, The Guardian and the London Review of Books.

Bibliography
 Bloody Nasty People: The Rise of Britain's Far Right (2013) Verso Books 
 Lights in the Distance: Exile and Refuge at the Borders of Europe (2018)

References

Living people
English atheists
English male journalists
English male non-fiction writers
English non-fiction writers
Year of birth missing (living people)